Mark Tucker (born c. 1962) is a former American football. He served as the head football coach at Charleston Southern University from 2017 to 2018. Tucker was named head coach in 2017. He resigned from the position in December 2018, posting an overall record of 11–11 as head coach.

Head coaching record

College

References

Year of birth missing (living people)
1960s births
Living people
Charleston Southern Buccaneers football coaches
East Tennessee State Buccaneers football coaches
East Tennessee State Buccaneers football players
The Citadel Bulldogs football coaches
High school football coaches in South Carolina
High school football coaches in Virginia
Sportspeople from Charleston, South Carolina
Coaches of American football from South Carolina
Players of American football from South Carolina